Juan Ignacio González Ibarra (born 8 July 1984) is a Mexican former professional footballer who played as a defender.

Honours
León
 Ascenso MX: Clausura 2012
 Liga MX: Apertura 2013, Clausura 2014, Guardianes 2020

External links 
 
 

1984 births
Living people
Footballers from Jalisco
Association football defenders
Club León footballers
Liga MX players
Mexican footballers